Cemmaes is a village in northern Powys, Wales, in Glantwymyn community.

The population numbered 935 in 1841, this dropped sharply between 1881 and 1891 from 946 to 729.

There was a railway station in the village on the Mawddwy Railway which connected to the main Cambrian Line at Cemmaes Road.

This is the village in which the author, George Borrow, in his 'Wild Wales' book, of 1862, describes his amusing incident, in the local pub, whilst on a walking tour. The extract was included, also, in the book 'In the Country', in 1975.

References

External links 
Photos of Cemmaes and surrounding area on geograph

Villages in Powys
Glantwymyn